This is a list of the honours won by football clubs in Cape Verde. It lists every Capeverdean association football club to have won any of the trophies at the national and the regional level.  Cape Verdean clubs never won any major official African competition.

Honours table

National
It lists every Capeverdean association football club to have won any of the major domestic trophies, the Cape Verdean Football Championships, the Cape Verdean Cup and the Cape Verdean Super Cup.

Cape Verde is one of a very few countries in which a regional winner competes at the national championship and stays for a season except for the champion.  It is one of a very few countries that uses the points system at the national level and now has only 6 rounds per group and the knockout phase.

Regional
It lists every regional association football club to have won any of the minor domestic trophies, the Championship, the Cup, the Super Cup, the Opening Tournament (Association Sup in some areas) and the Champions' Cup of some islands.

The regional title lists titles won during the Colonial era and since independence.

Boa Vista

Brava

Fogo

Maio

Sal

Santiago
Since 2003, the island competitions are divided into two Zones.  The North Zone does not have the Cup the Super Cup and the Opening Tournament competitions.  Its lists both the totals and the two zones from 2003

Total

South Zone

Santo Antão
Since 2003, the island competitions are divided into two Zones.  Its lists both the totals and the two zones from 2003, the Santo Antão Cup totals is with other regional titles of each zone.

Total

North Zone

South Zone

São Nicolau

São Vicente

Notes

External links
Rec.Sport.Soccer Statistics Foundation (archived 22 December 2012)

Cape Verde by honours won
Football clubs